The 1995 Supercopa Libertadores was the eighth season of the Supercopa Libertadores, a club football tournament for past Copa Libertadores winners. Independiente, who beat Flamengo 2–1 on aggregate in the final, won the competition for the second consecutive year.

1994 Copa Libertadores winners Vélez Sársfield took part in the Supercopa Sudamericana for the first time, taking the number of participants to 17.

Teams

Preliminary round
The matches were played from 13 September to 18 October.

With 17 teams taking part, the first round consisted of 7 two-legged ties and a round robin group consisting of the remaining 3 teams.

Knockout phase

Bracket

Quarterfinals
The matches were played from 24 October to 2 November.

Semifinals
The matches were played from 15 November to 23 November.

Finals

Independiente won 21 on aggregate.

See also
List of Copa Libertadores winners
1995 Copa Libertadores
1996 Recopa Sudamericana

References

External links
RSSSF
RSSSF (Full Details)

Supercopa Libertadores
2